Community High School, Ileogbo was established on May 25, 1982, by the people of Ileogbo, Osun State, Nigeria. It is situated along Gbongan road. The first principal was Mr. M.O. Ajayi while the second principal was chief S.O. Ogundeji.

Community High School is divided into junior and senior secondary schools. The name of the principal for junior secondary school is Mr. S.A. Nafiu while the name of the principal for senior secondary school is chief B.T. Obisesan.

The principal of senior school, chief B.T. Obisesan is the Akeweje of Ileogbo Land and the president of All Nigeria Confederation of Principal of Secondary Schools (ANCOPSS) in Osun State.

Educational institutions established in 1982
Secondary schools in Osun State
1982 establishments in Nigeria